Meiereibach may refer to:

 Meiereibach (Darmbach), a river of Hesse, Germany
 Meiereibach (Mühlenau), a river of Schleswig-Holstein, Germany